The 1999 Saarland state election was held on 5 September 1999 to elect the members of the Landtag of Saarland. The incumbent Social Democratic Party (SPD) government led by Minister-President Reinhard Klimmt was defeated. The Christian Democratic Union (CDU) won a narrow majority of one seat. CDU leader Peter Müller was subsequently elected minister-president.

Parties
The table below lists parties represented in the previous Landtag of Saarland.

Opinion polling

Election result

|-
! colspan="2" | Party
! Votes
! %
! +/-
! Seats 
! +/-
! Seats %
|-
| bgcolor=| 
| align=left | Christian Democratic Union (CDU)
| align=right| 253,856
| align=right| 45.5
| align=right| 6.9
| align=right| 26
| align=right| 5
| align=right| 51.0
|-
| bgcolor=| 
| align=left | Social Democratic Party (SPD)
| align=right| 247,311
| align=right| 44.4
| align=right| 5.0
| align=right| 25
| align=right| 2
| align=right| 49.0
|-
! colspan=8|
|-
| bgcolor=| 
| align=left | Alliance 90/The Greens (Grüne)
| align=right| 18,106
| align=right| 3.2
| align=right| 2.3
| align=right| 0
| align=right| 3
| align=right| 0
|-
| bgcolor=| 
| align=left | Free Democratic Party (FDP)
| align=right| 14,259
| align=right| 2.6
| align=right| 0.5
| align=right| 0
| align=right| ±0
| align=right| 0
|-
| bgcolor=|
| align=left | Others
| align=right| 23,805
| align=right| 4.2
| align=right| 
| align=right| 0
| align=right| ±0
| align=right| 0
|-
! align=right colspan=2| Total
! align=right| 557,337
! align=right| 100.0
! align=right| 
! align=right| 51
! align=right| ±0
! align=right| 
|-
! align=right colspan=2| Voter turnout
! align=right| 
! align=right| 68.7
! align=right| 14.8
! align=right| 
! align=right| 
! align=right| 
|}

Sources
 The Federal Returning Officer 

1999
Saarland
September 1999 events in Europe